The Pennsylvania Roar was the name of a professional indoor soccer team based in Reading, Pennsylvania. They were a member of the Major Indoor Soccer League.

The Roar were co-owned by Glen Goldstein and his wife, Dawn Goldstein, who also co-owned the St. Louis Ambush of the MISL.

Year-by-year

Head coaches
  Eric Puls

Arenas
 Santander Arena

References

External links
Official Website

Major Indoor Soccer League (2008–2014) teams
Defunct indoor soccer clubs in the United States
Association football clubs established in 2013
Soccer clubs in Pennsylvania